The 1986 Big Ten Conference baseball tournament was held at Siebert Field on the campus of the University of Minnesota in Minneapolis, Minnesota, from May 16 through 18. The top two teams from the regular season in each division participated in the double-elimination tournament, the sixth annual tournament sponsored by the Big Ten Conference to determine the league champion.  won their fourth tournament championship and earned the Big Ten Conference's automatic bid to the 1986 NCAA Division I baseball tournament.

Format and seeding 
The 1986 tournament was a 4-team double-elimination tournament, with seeds determined by conference regular season winning percentage within each division. The top seed from each division played the second seed from the opposite division in the first round. Minnesota claimed the top seed by tiebreaker. Wisconsin made its only appearance in the tournament field before dropping baseball in 1991.

Tournament

All-Tournament Team 
The following players were named to the All-Tournament Team.

Most Outstanding Player 
Tim McIntosh was named Most Outstanding Player. McIntosh was an outfielder for Minnesota.

References 

Tournament
Big Ten baseball tournament
Big Ten Baseball Tournament
Big Ten baseball tournament
College baseball tournaments in Minnesota
Baseball competitions in Minneapolis